Crécy-la-Chapelle station (French: Gare de Crécy-la-Chapelle) is a railway station serving the town Crécy-la-Chapelle, Seine-et-Marne department, northern France. It is the terminus of the line from Esbly to Crécy-la-Chapelle.

See also 

 List of SNCF stations in Île-de-France
 List of Transilien stations

External links

 

Railway stations in Seine-et-Marne
Railway stations in France opened in 1902